Avochie Castle is a ruined tower house, dating from the 16th century, or early 17th century, around  north of Huntly, east of the river Deveron, in Aberdeenshire, Scotland.

The modern Avochie House is just to the west.

History
This was originally a property of the Gordons of Avochie, who were active in the conflicts of the reign of Mary Queen of Scots and her son James VI.

It was the property of Adam Hay Gordon in 1871.

Structure
The gable ends, with a corbelled-out bartizan at the south-east, are all that remains of the castle.

It has been said, “It has scarcely a claim to be the title of "Castle" as it was only a small quadrangular building of scarcely two stories”.

It is a category B listed building.

References

Castles in Aberdeenshire